Monodonta lugubris is a species of sea snail, a marine gastropod mollusk in the family Trochidae, the top snails.

Monodonta lugubris is considered by CLEMAM a synonym of Phorcus lineatus (da Costa, 1778). Henry Pilsbry, on the other hand, considered already in 1889 that the name lineatus of Da Costa, used until that time by many authors, should be considered inadmissible on account of the failure of that author to use generic in combination with his specific names. To add to the confusion, the website gastropods.com considers Monodonta lugubris a synonym of Osilinus lineatus lineatus Costa, E.M. da, 1778, while WoRMS considers Osilinus lineatus a synonym of Phorcus lineatus.

Description

Distribution

References

 Lamarck [J.-B. M.] de (1815–1822). Histoire naturelle des animaux sans vertèbres. Paris: 7 volumes. Vol. 1 [Introduction]: Verdière, i-xvi, 1–462 [March 1815]; Vol. 2 [les Polypes, les Radiaires]: Verdière, 1–568 [March 1816]; Vol. 3 [suite des Radiaires; les Tuniciers; les Vers]: Verdière, 1–586 [August, 1816]; Vol. 4: Deterville/Verdière, 1–603 [April 1817]; Vol. 5 [les Arachnides; les Crustacés; les Annélides; les Cirrhipèdes; les Conchiferes]: Paris, Deterville/Verdière, 1–612 [25 July 1818]; Vol. 6(1) [suite des Conchifères; Les Mollusques]: published by the Author, i-vi, 1–343 [June 1819]; Vol. 6(2) (suite): published by the Author, 1–232 [April 1822]; Vol. 7 (suite): published by the Author, 1–711. [August 1822]

lugubris
Taxa named by Jean-Baptiste Lamarck
Gastropods described in 1822